The Blue Pages may refer to:

 The Blue pages, a defunct telephone directory listing of American and Canadian government agencies
 American Authors, a band formerly known as the Blue Pages
 "The Blue Pages", a song by Noah Gordon (singer)
 The Blue Pages, a book published by Polipoint Press

See also

 Blue Book (disambiguation)
 Blue paper, technical specification white paper
 Blue (disambiguation)
 Page (disambiguation)